This was the first edition of the event as a WTA International tournament.

Ana Konjuh won the title, defeating Monica Niculescu in the final, 1–6, 6–4, 6–2.

Seeds

Draw

Finals

Top half

Bottom half

Qualifying

Seeds

Qualifiers

Qualifying draw

First qualifier

Second qualifier

Third qualifier

Fourth qualifier

References
 Main Draw
 Qualifying Draw

Nottingham Open - Singles
2015 Women's Singles